Virgin Australia Airlines may refer to:

Virgin Australia, Australian airline
Virgin Australia Airlines (NZ), New Zealand airline